Lauren Burgess (born 24 November 1986 in New Plymouth, New Zealand) is a New Zealand rugby union player. She plays in the Centre position for the Manawatu Cyclones, and for New Zealand's national women's sevens team.

Rugby union career
Her transition back to rugby was with the Stratford club, after they decided to field a team in the Manawatu club competition. It didn't take long for her talent to be recognised - she was selected in the Manawatu rep side as a midfielder before a back injury sidelined her for the season.

She came back strongly and set her sights on making the national women's sevens squad. After being identified as a long-term prospect, she attended several training camps before being named in the squad to travel to Dubai for the inaugural IRB women's world series tournament.

Burgess was then selected and named captain in the Taranaki women's sevens side to compete in a regional tournament in Palmerston North. She was also one of three Taranaki representatives who had been selected in the New Zealand Go4Gold programme set up to identify potential talent ahead of the Rio Olympics in 2016.

Netball career

Together with older sister Erica, Burgess excelled at netball from the outset, moving through the representative grades at high school before eventually being named captain of the New Zealand secondary schools squad in 2004, a side that contained such illustrious names as Maria Tutaia and Cathrine Latu.

From there the midcourter became a regular fixture in the now defunct Western Flyers in the National Bank Cup, before being signed with the Central Pulse for the inaugural season of the ANZ Championship. After the Pulse failed to win a game in 2008, the team roster was overhauled and she was not signed for the 2009 season. Burgess nevertheless received a call-up to the Southern Steel bench in Round 2 that year as a temporary replacement for the injured Megan Hutton.

References

New Zealand netball players
Southern Steel players
Central Pulse players
Rugby union players from New Plymouth
Living people
1986 births
New Zealand female rugby union players
Female rugby sevens players
ANZ Championship players
People educated at Inglewood High School, New Zealand
Western Flyers players